Simon Kerrod (born 25 August 1992) is a South African rugby union player, currently playing with English Premiership side Harlequins. His regular position is tighthead prop.

Club career
He represented the  Under-19 team in 2011 and their Under-21 team in 2012.

He was included in the senior squad for the 2013 Vodacom Cup competition and made his debut against Argentine side .

Later that year, he was also included in a South African Barbarians team to face Saracens in London.

He also represented College Rovers in the 2013 SARU Community Cup tournament.

He was selected on the bench for the  side to face  during a tour match during a 2014 incoming tour. He came on as a substitute for the injured Charl du Plessis shortly before half time as the Kings suffered a 12–34 defeat. However, Kerrod got his first points in a Kings shirt as he scored a try with a minute to go in the match.

He joined English RFU Championship side Jersey in January 2016. 
On 21 February 2017, Kerrod makes move to the Aviva Premiership with Worcester Warriors from the 2017-18 season. On 21 March 2019, Kerrod sign for Premiership rivals Harlequins from the 2019-20 season.

International career
In October 2020 Kerrod was called up to a senior England training squad by head coach Eddie Jones.

References

South African rugby union players
Living people
1992 births
Sharks (Currie Cup) players
Eastern Province Elephants players
Border Bulldogs players
Jersey Reds players
Worcester Warriors players
Harlequin F.C. players
Rugby union props